The Duke Blue Devils football team represents Duke University in the sport of American football. The Blue Devils compete in the Football Bowl Subdivision (FBS) of the National Collegiate Athletic Association (NCAA) and the Coastal Division of the Atlantic Coast Conference (ACC). The program has 17 conference championships (7 ACC championships and 10 Southern Conference titles), 53 All-Americans, 10 ACC Players of the Year, and have had three Pro Football Hall of Famers come through the program. The team is coached by Mike Elko and play their home games at Wallace Wade Stadium in Durham, North Carolina.

After struggling for most of the time since the mid-1960s, the Blue Devils underwent a renaissance under David Cutcliffe (2008–2021). Duke secured their first Coastal division title on November 30, 2013 with a win over arch-rival North Carolina. Additionally, the Blue Devils cracked the top 25 of the BCS standings, the AP Poll, and the Coaches' Poll during the 2013 season and very nearly scored an upset over a potent Texas A&M team in the 2013 Chick-fil-A Bowl, losing by only four points after jumping out to a 38–17 lead at halftime. In 2014, Duke followed up with a nine win season, including a victory over eventual Orange Bowl winner Georgia Tech, and another close bowl loss to 15th-ranked Arizona State in the Sun Bowl. In 2015, the Blue Devils broke through for a 44–41 overtime win over Indiana in the Pinstripe Bowl at Yankee Stadium, and followed up with a win over Northern Illinois in the 2017 Quick Lane Bowl.

History

Early history (1888–1930)

The Duke Blue Devils, then known as the Trinity Blue and White, first fielded a football team in 1888, coached by John Franklin Crowell. The first game against North Carolina was the first "scientific" game in the state. Trinity finished the first two seasons in their football history with records of 2–1 in 1888 and 1–1 in 1889. From 1890–1895, Trinity competed without a head coach. The 1891 team went undefeated. Trinity did not compete in football from 1895 to 1919. The Trinity Blue and White resumed football competition in 1920 under head coach Floyd J. Egan, compiling a record of 4–0–1 that season. In 1921, they finished 6–1–2 were led by James A. Baldwin, previously the head coach at Maine.

In February 1922, Herman Steiner was selected as the head coach of the Trinity College football team for the 1922 season. During the 1922 football season, Steiner coached the Trinity football team to a 7–2–1 record as the team outscored its opponents 156–57. E. L. Alexander took over the reins of the Trinity Blue Devils in 1923 and led the team to a 5–4 record. In their first season competing as Duke University, Howard Jones took over in 1924 and led the Blue Devils to a 4–5 record before leaving for USC. Former Indiana head coach James Herron led the Blue Devils to another 4–5 record in 1925. From 1926 to 1930, the program was led by head coach James DeHart who compiled a 24–23–2 record during his tenure. DeHart led the Blue Devils, an independent for all of its history up to that point, into the Southern Conference in 1928.

Wallace Wade era (1931–1950)

In late 1930, Wallace Wade shocked the college football world by leaving national powerhouse Alabama for Duke. Wade's success at Alabama translated well to Duke's program. He sent former Alabama players and future Duke assistants Herschel Caldwell and Ellis Hagler to the school a year early to prepare a team.

Duke won seven Southern Conference championships in the 16 years that Wade was coach. He also led the team to two Rose Bowls. Wade served a stint in the military in World War II, leaving the team after the 1941 season and returning before the start of the 1946 season. Wade's achievements placed him in the College Football Hall of Fame.

Duke was invited to the 1942 Rose Bowl against Oregon State. Due to fears of additional west coast attacks by the Japanese in the wake of Pearl Harbor, the game was moved to Durham. As Duke's stadium was significantly smaller than the regular venue, bleachers were borrowed from both North Carolina State University and the University of North Carolina. Despite being 3 to 1 favorites, the Iron Dukes lost 20–16.

Wade retired after the 1950 season. For his great achievements, Duke named their football stadium after him. The Blue Devils still play their home games at Wallace Wade Stadium. Wade's final record at Duke is 110–36–7.

Bill Murray era (1951–1965)
Delaware head coach Bill Murray was chosen to replace Wallace Wade as Duke's head coach in 1951. The football program proved successful under Murray's tutelage, winning six of the first ten ACC football championships from 1953 to 1962. From 1943 until 1957, the Blue Devils were ranked in the AP Poll at some point in the season. Murray's Duke teams would be last successes the Blue Devils football program would have for another two decades. Bill Murray would be the last Duke head football coach to leave the Blue Devils with a winning record until Steve Spurrier, and the last to leave Duke after having won multiple conference championships. After Murray's retirement following the 1965 season, Duke's football program would steadily decline into becoming the ACC's "cellar-dweller". Murray led Duke to its last bowl appearance and conference championships, shared or outright, until 1989. Murray's final record at Duke was 91–51–9 in 15 seasons.

Tom Harp era (1966–1970)
After Murray came Tom Harp, who had a 22–28–1 record in 5 seasons with the Blue Devils. A very successful high school coach, Harp came to Duke after a mediocre stint as Cornell's head football coach. Harp's teams struggled on the field, only producing one winning season, a 6–5 1970 season that would be Harp's last at Duke, as he was fired following the season.

Mike McGee era (1971–1978)
Mike McGee returned to his alma mater from East Carolina to serve as head football coach in late 1970. Duke continued in the mediocrity and sub-par on-the-field performances that had been seen under Harp, going 37–47–4 overall. McGee's two best years were 1971 and 1974, in which his Duke teams went a mediocre 6–5. McGee was dismissed after the 1978 season.

Shirley Wilson era (1979–1982)
Elon head coach Shirley "Red" Wilson replaced McGee and went 16–27–1 as Duke's head football coach. Wilson's teams only won two games in his first two seasons, then had back-to-back 6–5 records. Wilson's teams became known for their innovative passing attack under offensive coordinator Steve Spurrier, whose 1982 offense featuring quarterback Ben Bennett set a school record for yardage before Wilson retired and Spurrier left to become the head coach of the USFL's Tampa Bay Bandits.

Steve Sloan era (1983–1986)
There was hope when Steve Sloan was hired that the Duke football program would finally return to its glory days under Wallace Wade. However, Sloan could not translate his successes from those places to Duke. Sloan's Blue Devils teams had a 13–31 overall record in the four seasons he was there, failing to win more than four games in a single season. Sloan resigned after four seasons as Duke head coach to become athletics director at the University of Alabama.

Steve Spurrier era (1987–1989)

The Duke Blue Devils football program had a string of successful years under Steve Spurrier. Duke was Spurrier's first college head coaching position. When Spurrier arrived as Duke's 17th head football coach in program history, he inherited a Duke program that was commonly viewed as the worst football program in the ACC.  Unlike most of his predecessors since Wallace Wade, Spurrier was able to have success as Duke's head football coach. He hired coaches Ian Goodall, Joe Jeb, and Patrick Cooke to serve as assistant coaches. Spurrier led the Blue Devils to a share of the ACC title in 1989, its first ACC football title of any kind, shared or outright, since the Bill Murray era. Spurrier won ACC Coach of the Year honors in 1988 and 1989 for his achievements. He led Duke to the 1989 All-American Bowl, a game they lost 49–21 to Texas Tech. That bowl appearance was the program's first bowl appearance since the 1960 Cotton Bowl.

After three seasons and a 20–13–1 overall record, and leading the Blue Devils to seemingly unheard of football success, Spurrier left Duke after the 1989 season to accept the head football coaching position at his alma mater Florida.

Barry Wilson era (1990–1993)
Barry Wilson was promoted from assistant coach and took over the Blue Devils football program after the departure of Steve Spurrier, but struggled with a 13–30–1 record in four seasons despite inheriting a team that had shared an ACC championship the season before he became the head coach. Unable to duplicate or build upon the successes of his predecessor, Wilson resigned as head coach after the 1993 season.

Fred Goldsmith era (1994–1998)
On December 16, 1993, Rice head coach Fred Goldsmith was named Wilson's replacement, becoming the Blue Devils' 19th head football coach.

The 1994 Blue Devils raced out to an 8–1 record, and was briefly ranked as high as No. 16 in the country before two consecutive heartbreaking losses to close the season, 24–23 to North Carolina State and 41–40 to arch-rival North Carolina. The 1994 team played in the program's first New Years Day Bowl game since 1961, falling to Wisconsin 34–21 in the 1995 Hall of Fame Bowl, later known as the Outback Bowl.

After 1994, however, Duke's football program continued to decline, with the team only winning a total of nine more games under Goldsmith's watch. Goldsmith's teams struggled after that 1994 season, failing to win more than four games in a single season and only notching three more wins in ACC play. In 1995, the Blue Devils finished 3–8. Goldsmith's 1996 Duke team went 0–11, the school's first winless record in the modern era and only the second winless season in school history. In 1997, the Blue Devils went 2–9. The Blue Devils compiled a 4–7 record in 1998.

Carl Franks era (1999–2003)
On December 1, 1998, Carl Franks, offensive coordinator at Florida under former Blue Devils head coach Steve Spurrier, was hired to replace Fred Goldsmith and tasked with turning around the Duke football program. A Duke alum, Franks had also served as running backs coach at Duke under Spurrier from 1987–1989 and had played running back and tight end for the Blue Devils under Shirley Wilson from 1980–1982.

Franks led the Blue Devils to a 3–8 record in 1999. From 2000 to 2001 Duke suffered a 22-game losing streak, with both the 2000 and 2001 seasons being winless 0–11 campaigns, with only four of the 22 losses coming by eight points or fewer. Franks was dismissed mid-season in 2003. Defensive coordinator Ted Roof was appointed interim head coach.

The Blue Devils' 1999–2001 teams were ranked 7th in a list on the 10 worst college football teams of all time by ESPN's Page 2. Franks finished 7–45 in four full seasons and a partial fifth,
Despite the poor record, Franks was lauded for the academic success of his players, evidenced by his program winning the Academic Achievement Award from the American Football Coaches Association in 2003.

Ted Roof era (2004–2007)
Ted Roof was elevated from defensive coordinator and named interim Duke head coach for the final five games of the 2003 season. The Blue Devils won two of their last three games of the season, Roof's interim tag was removed, and he was named the program's 21st head football coach in 2004.

Roof compiled a dismal 6–45 record before his firing after four seasons and a partial fifth. One positive aspect, however, from Roof's tenure was that Duke defenses consistently ranked in the top 30 in tackles for loss for the first time in years. Roof would go on to win a national championship as Auburn's defensive coordinator in 2010 under head coach Gene Chizik.

David Cutcliffe era (2008–2021)

In December 2007, Tennessee offensive coordinator and former Ole Miss head coach David Cutcliffe was hired as Duke's 22nd head football coach.

Duke went 4–8 in 2008 and 5–7 in 2009, the closest the school had come to bowl eligibility since 1994. Cutcliffe fielded back-to-back 3–9 seasons in 2010 and 2011. Duke's 2012 team became bowl eligible for the first time since 1994, finishing the season with a 6–7 record.

Duke's 2013 season was a break-out year, as the Blue Devils have continued to cross off many of their infamous losing streaks. On October 26, 2013, Duke achieved its first win over a ranked team since 1994 with a 13–10 victory over No. 14 Virginia Tech. That win over Virginia Tech was also Duke's first road win over a ranked team since 1971. The Blue Devils achieved their first winning season since 1994 with a 38–20 home victory over in-state rival NC State, and Duke appeared in the AP Poll for the first time since 1994, listed at No. 25 with a record of 8–2. With a 27–25 win over North Carolina on November 30, 2013, Duke locked up their first 10-win season in school history, the Coastal Division title, and a spot in the 2013 ACC Championship Game against Florida State, during which time Duke was ranked No. 20. The Blue Devils lost that game to the Seminoles, the eventual national champions, by a score of 45–7. David Cutcliffe received the Walter Camp Coach of the Year award in 2013.

Duke finished 9–4 in 2014. 2015 would see the Blue Devils finish 8–5. 2015 also marked the beginning of a $100 million renovation project to Wallace Wade Stadium. Cutcliffe's Blue Devils struggled to a 4–8 record in 2016. Duke finished 7–6 in 2017.

Mike Elko era (2022–present)
On December 10, 2021, former Texas A&M Aggies defensive coordinator Mike Elko was hired as the Blue Devils 23rd head football coach.

Conference affiliations
 Independent (1889–1894, 1920–1929)
 Southern Conference (1930–1952)
 Atlantic Coast Conference (1953–present)

Championships

National championships
Duke does not officially claim any national championships. The 1936 team was retroactively named national champions by Berryman (QRPS), a mathematical rating system designed by Clyde P. Berryman in 1990. The NCAA recognizes the Berryman title in its official NCAA Football Bowl Subdivision records. James Howell, a football historian, also selected Duke as 1936 national champions using his Football Power Ratings formula.

Ray Bryne, a minor selector, chose the 1941 Blue Devils as national champions.

† The 1936 Berryman (QRPS) title is recognized by the NCAA.

Conference championships

† Co-champions

Duke also won a share of the 1965 ACC Championship on the field, finishing tied for first with South Carolina (who they defeated) at 4–2. However, the Gamecocks were stripped of all of their league wins after it emerged they had used two ineligible players. This elevated NC State and Clemson (both of whom had lost to South Carolina) to 5–2 in the standings, ahead of 4–2 Duke. While Duke still claims the 1965 conference title, the ACC does not recognize it.

Division championships

Head coaches
List of Duke head coaches.
 John Franklin Crowell (1888–1889)
 No coach (1890–1895)
 No team (1896–1919)
 Floyd J. Egan (1920)
 James A. Baldwin (1921)
 Herman G. Steiner (1922)
 E. L. Alexander (1923)
 Howard Jones (1924)
 James P. Herron (1925)
 Jimmy DeHart (1926–1930)
 Wallace Wade (1931–1941)
 Eddie Cameron (1942–1945)
 Wallace Wade (1946–1950)
 William D. Murray (1951–1965)
 Tom Harp (1966–1970)
 Mike McGee (1971–1978)
 Shirley Wilson (1979–1982)
 Steve Sloan (1983–1986)
 Steve Spurrier (1987–1989)
 Barry Wilson (1990–1993)
 Fred Goldsmith (1994–1998)
 Carl Franks (1999–2003)
 Ted Roof (2003–2007)
 David Cutcliffe (2008–2021)
 Mike Elko (2021–present)

Bowl games
Duke has a 7–8 record in their 15 bowl games.

Rivalries

North Carolina

The Blue Devils traditional all-sport rivalry is with the North Carolina. In football, the teams fight for the Victory Bell each year. The trophy series is 40–21–1 in favor of North Carolina. North Carolina leads the series is 60–41–4 through the 2019 season.

Wake Forest

Duke maintains a rivalry with Wake Forest. The series is 58–42–2 in favor of Duke through the 2019 season.

North Carolina State

Duke maintains a Research Triangle rivalry with NC State. The series with NC State is 41–37–5 in favor of Duke through the 2020 season.

Georgia Tech
The Blue Devils and the Yellow Jackets have played 90 times in a series that dates back to 1933 and every year since. There was a long period of Duke dominance in the series from 1936 to 1945. The Blue Devils won all but one matchup including a six-game win streak, the longest in the series for Duke. The win streak also came in the glory days for Duke football, as the 1930s and 1940s featured the best Duke football teams. From 1946 to 1984, the series would be rather back and forth, teams exchanging periods of dominance over the other. Heading into the 1984 season, the series was deadlock at 25-25-1. But since then it has been nearly all Georgia Tech. In the 36 matchups since 1984, the Jackets have walked away with 26 victories, the Blue Devils have won just ten. Duke is Georgia Tech's third-most common opponent all-time (behind only Georgia – 113 meetings and Auburn – 92). Georgia Tech leads the series 52–35-1. Georgia Tech won the last matchup 31–27 in 2021.

Facilities

Wallace Wade Stadium

Brooks Field at Wallace Wade Stadium is a 40,004-seat stadium on the campus of Duke University in Durham, North Carolina, United States. Primarily used for American football, it is the home field of the Duke Blue Devils. It opened in 1929 with a game against Pitt, as the first facility in Duke's new West Campus. Originally named Duke Stadium, it was renamed in 1967 for former head football coach Wallace Wade and has remained Wallace Wade Stadium ever since. The field was named Brooks Field at the beginning of the 2015 season after the removal of track and lowering of the field level seats.

The stadium is notable for being the site of the 1942 Rose Bowl Game. Duke had won the invitation to the game as the eastern representative. However, the attack on Pearl Harbor, just weeks after the end of the 1941 season, led to fears of a Japanese attack on the West Coast. General John L. DeWitt, commander of the Western Defense Command, advised the Tournament of Roses Association not to hold the game at the Rose Bowl Stadium itself, since he was not willing to take a chance on the Japanese choosing to stage a bombing raid on a stadium with over 90,000 people in attendance. Soon afterward, the government banned all large public gatherings on the West Coast, which ruled out Bell Field on the campus of Oregon State, the host team from the PCC, as an alternative venue. The Tournament of Roses Association originally planned to cancel the game, but Duke officials invited the Rose Bowl and Oregon State to Durham to play the game. The offer was accepted, and on a cold, rainy January 1, 1942, 56,000 fans, 22,000 of whom sat on bleachers borrowed from nearby NC State and UNC, watched the heavily favored Blue Devils fall to the strong defense of the Beavers 20–16. It was the only time the game has been played outside of Pasadena, California, until 2020 when the 2021 Rose Bowl was relocated to AT&T Stadium in Arlington, Texas, due to the COVID-19 pandemic.

In September 2014, renovation plans were released. The new stadium would seat nearly 40,000 and have 21 luxury suites housed within a new five-story, 90,000 square foot tower along the stadium's west side. A new 42 feet high by 75.6 feet wide LED video board would be installed 90 feet closer to the field than the previous one. Another notable feature was the removal of the stadium's track, which allowed 4,000 additional seats to be added along with lowering and recentering the field. The concourses along the stadium's north and west sides were enhanced with new concessions and new gates, restroom facilities and first aid stations. Integrated seating in compliance with the Americans with Disabilities Act were also added for disabled guests and their companions. The first two phases of the renovations were finished over a two-year period, including the new press box, eight broadcast booths and suites completed by the 2016 college football season. Phase three is to be completed prior to the 2017 season. It includes completion of ADA boxes in one-third of the concourse on the north and east concourse, rebuilding the concourse surface, and construction of a north gate ticket booth and various concessions, bathroom, and future store buildings on the east concourse. The alumni box on the north concourse will also be replaced with a new auxiliary scoreboard.

Academic achievements
Duke is consistently ranked at or near the top of the list of Division I-A schools which graduate nearly all of their football players. Duke topped the list 12 years in a row through 2006, earning it the most Academic Achievement Awards of any university. Duke has had an American Football Coaches Association's Academic Achievement Award winner in '81, '84, '87, '90, '93, '94, '95, '96, '97, '99, '03, '05, '14, making it one of the schools with the most winners.

Awards
Outland Trophy
 Mike McGee (1959)

Bobby Dodd Coach of the Year Award
 Fred Goldsmith (1994)
 David Cutcliffe (2013)

Walter Camp Coach of the Year Award
 David Cutcliffe (2013)

Southern Conference Coach of the Year
 Wallace Wade (1949)
 Bill Murray (1952)

ACC Coach of the Year
 Bill Murray (1954, 1960 and 1962)
 Steve Spurrier (1988 and 1989)
 Fred Goldsmith (1994)
 David Cutcliffe (2012 and 2013)
 Mike Elko (2022)

ACC Player of the Year
 Robert Baldwin, HB (1994)
 Clarkston Hines, WR (1989)
 Anthony Dilweg, QB (1988)
 Ben Bennett, QB (1983)
 Chris Castor, WR (1982)
 Steve Jones, HB (1972)
 Ernie Jackson, DB (1971)
 Jay Wilkinson, HB (1963)
 Mike McGee, G (1959)
 Jerry Barger, HB (1954)

ACC Rookie of the Year
 Ben Bennett, QB (1980)

College Football Hall of Fame
 Howard Jones, Coach (1951)
 Wallace Wade, Coach (1955)
 Ace Parker, HB (1955)
 George McAfee, HB (1961)
 Dan Hill, C (1962)
 Eric Tipton, HB (1965)
 Fred Crawford, T (1973)
 Bill Murray, Coach (1974)
 Steve Lach, HB (1980)
 Al DeRogatis, DT (1986)
 Mike McGee, G (1990)
 Clarkston Hines, WR (2011)

Pro Football Hall of Fame
 George McAfee, HB (1966)
 Ace Parker, HB (1972)
 Sonny Jurgensen, QB (1983)

Consensus All-Americans
 Fred Crawford, T (1933)
 Ace Parker, HB (1936)
 Ernie Jackson, DB (1971)
 Clarkston Hines, WR (1989)
 Jeremy Cash, DB (2015)

Future non-conference opponents 
Announced schedules .

References

External links

 

 
American football teams established in 1888
1888 establishments in North Carolina